The 18233/18234 Narmada Express is a daily express train which runs between Indore city of Madhya Pradesh and Bilaspur city of Chhattisgarh.

The name 'Narmada' signifies the largest river of Central India, Narmada River. As the train crosses holy river Narmada, the longest and most important river in Madhya Pradesh, so is named as Narmada Express.

Coach composition

The train consists of 23 coaches:

 1 AC First Class
 1 AC II Tier
 4 AC III Tier
 11 Sleeper Class
 4 General Unreserved
 2 Seating cum Luggage Rake

Service

The 18233/Narmada Express has an average speed of 42 km/hr and covers 1007 km in 24 hrs 00 mins.

The 18234/Narmada Express has an average speed of 42 km/hr and covers 1007 km in 24 hrs 10 mins.

Route & Halts

The important halts of the train are:

 
 
 
 
 
 
 
 
 
 Narmadapuram
 
 
 
 
 
 Jabalpur

Schedule

Direction reversal

Train reverses its direction at:

 
 Itarsi Junction

Traction

Both trains are hauled by an Itarsi-based WAP-4 locomotive from Indore to Itarsi and from Itarsi to Bilaspur it is hauled by an Itarsi-based WAP-7 locomotive and vice versa.

See also

 Bhopal–Bilaspur Express

References

Transport in Indore
Transport in Bilaspur, Chhattisgarh
Named passenger trains of India
Bilaspur, Chhattisgarh
Rail transport in Chhattisgarh
Rail transport in Madhya Pradesh
Railway services introduced in 1982
Express trains in India